

Uatu

Ulik

Ultimaton 

Ultimaton, also known as Weapon XV, is a living weapon created by the anti-mutant supersoldier program Weapon Plus. The character was created by Grant Morrison and Chris Bachalo, first appeared in New X-Men #143 (August 2003). Ultimaton escapes from the Weapon Plus facilities, fights the X-Men and is destroyed. He is later resurrected to guard a child clone of Apocalypse.

Ultimo

Ultimus

Ultimus (Ard-Con) was created by Gerry Conway and John Buscema, making his debut in Thor #209 as Demon Druid, while he made his debut as Ultimus in Wonder Man #7.

The Kree known as Ard-Con was a member of the Kree Eternal sub-race created by the Celestials. He with the other Kree Eternals travelled through space, eventually, coming across Earth 4000 years ago. The Celts of Earth mistook the Kree Eternals as deities and soon all Kree Eternals left Earth except Ard-Con who stayed on Earth for a millennium, but was then imprisoned by the Deviant, Tantalus. He also encountered Odin once, claiming that his name brought back memories, but also thought that Odin had died. He was then accidentally freed by Thor when the latter used Mjolnir to turn into Donald Blake. Once free, he started wreaking havoc across the streets and knocked Thor unconscious. He was then apprehended by the British Army and Thor again, but stopped fighting when Thor realized that Ard-Con was trying to reach a portal at Stonehenge in order to depart Earth. After that, Ard-Con successfully departed Earth.

Ard-Con was unable to find his people so returned to Earth thanks to a portal created by two tourists and the hero Meggan, who were under the influence of the Eternal. Shadowcat intervened and freed Meggan along with tourists and also allowing Rachel Summers getting some knowledge about his people. Ard-Con then broke into Darkmoor Nuclear Research Facility where he recreated a nuclear facsimile in order to use it at the Stonehenge and finally reunite with his people. However, the Excalibur intervened and stopped Captain Britain from fighting Ard-Con, while Kitty opened a portal to Ard-Con's people and apologized to him. This proved to be successful, however, upon arriving to his home, he was approached by the Supreme Intelligence who informed Ard-Con that he was the last surviving Kree Eternal. Then Ultimus, under the order of the Supremor, joined the Starforce.

He, along with rest of the team, were sent to capture the Avengers, since they had infiltrated Kree-Lar. They were successful in capturing the Avengers, however, the current rulers of the Kree, Ael-Dan and Dar-Benn, decided to execute both teams by locking them into a force field. Thankfully, Deathbird killed the emperors, which allowed the Supreme Intelligence to regain control of the Kree Empire. He then sent the team against the Shi'ar as a retaliation against his attempted assassination by the Shi'ar Empire. They teleported into the Shi'ar palace with Ultimus dispatching Earthquake and attacking Lilandra, however, Starfox distracted Ultimus long enough for Lilandra to strike Ultimus back. After being captured, they were sentenced to death by the Shi'ar, but things became complicated as it was revealed that the Shi'ar counselor Araki was replaced by a Skrull. Ultimus was released by Lilandra under her order to report about the Skrulls' plans. The Starforce was then integrated within the Imperial Guards and under the orders of Deathbird they attacked Quasar with his allies for their intrusion in Shi'ar space. After the Kree regained their autonomy, all of the Starforce members became defectors.

 Other versions
In What If? Avengers lost Kree-Shi'ar war, this version of Ultimus fought against the Avengers and the Imperial Guards, but was killed by the Imperial Guard, Flashire.

 In other media
Ultimus is a major villain in Marvel Strike Force.

Ultragirl 

Ultragirl (Suzanna Sherman, or Tsu-Zana) is an American comic book superhero created by Barbara Kesel and Leonard Kirk, who first appeared in Ultragirl #1 (November 1996). As one critic described, "She was a clever … modern riff on Supergirl, basically 'What would Supergirl be like if she debuted in the mid-1990s in the Marvel Universe?'"

Suzy Sherman is an aspiring model who, over the course of a few days, grows several inches, develops the physique of a bodybuilder, and acquires superpowers. She discovers that she is a mutant Kree warrior, born Tsu-Zana. She helps the superhero team New Warriors defeat the villain Effex. Her powers include flight, super-strength, multi-spectral vision, and a healing factor.

Ultragirl is a member of Captain America's Secret Avengers during the superhero civil war. She later joins the superhero training program the Initiative and enters a romantic relationship with Justice. She and Thor Girl become the Initiative heroes assigned to protect Georgia, with Carol Danvers/Ms. Marvel having been so impressed by Ultragirl's development that Danvers bequeaths Ultragirl her former Ms. Marvel costume.

During the Secret Invasion, the Skrull Dum Dum Dugan activates all the sleeper agents in the Initiative, causing Ultragirl and Thor Girl to fight each other out of suspicion. When the Skrull Kill Krew arrives on the scene, 3-D Man confirms Thor Girl is a Skrull, and he and Gravity kill her with her own hammer. She later is forced to give up the Ms. Marvel costume after an attorney informs her that its intellectual property rights are owned by the Avengers, at this time temporarily under the control of the villainous Norman Osborn. After saving Justice from the deranged Thor clone Ragnarok, Ultragirl leaves the Initiative to join Justice's revamped New Warriors team.

Following two brief appearances, Ultragirl took part in the Fear Itself storyline when she teamed with the genuine Thor Girl and confronted Prodigy. She later helped the Young Avengers battle the parasite being Mother.

She is not to be confused with the character Ultragirl from Megaton Comics.

Ultron

Ulysses

U-Man

Umar

Underworld

Unicorn

Milos Masaryk

Yegor Balinov

Aaidan Blomfield

Unnamed

Uni-Mind

Union Jack

James Montgomery Falsworth

Brian Falsworth

Joseph Chapman
Union Jack will make a reappearance as a member in the new UK marvel superhero team The Union.

Unspoken

The Unspoken is a fictional supervillain appearing in American comic books published by Marvel Comics. He is the cousin of Blackagar Boltagon (Black Bolt), and was once the king of all Inhumans before he was forced into exile. The Unspoken first appeared in The Mighty Avengers #27 and was created by Dan Slott, Khoi Pham, and Christos N. Gage.

Originally, the Unspoken was a just ruler to the Inhumans. However, fearful that it would corrupt his people, he decided to steal the Slave Engine, his people's greatest weapon, along with the Xerogen Crystals it utilized and buried them somewhere in Tibet. After refusing to reveal the Slave Engine's location, he was then challenged to a duel by the heir to the throne, a young Blackagar Boltagon. Despite being by far the strongest of the Inhumans, moving the Slave Engine had weakened the King which led to his defeat at the hands of Blackagar and his friends. His final stipulation was that his deeds be remembered, but Black Bolt had a crueler fate in mind: the King, his deeds, and the Slave Engine itself, were written out of Inhuman history. From that day on, he would be remembered only as a bogeyman to frighten small children, his name forevermore "unspoken".

He was later recovered by the Alpha Primitives, who cared for their fallen king. Realizing his mistake, the Unspoken plotted to return and reclaim his throne, cultivating the Xerogen Crystals, only for Attilan to rise into the sky. Cheated of his redemption and later learning of the silent war between the Inhumans and United States of America, the Unspoken decided to change his plans and unearth the Slave Engine using it to conquer Earth, by transforming all humans on the planet into Alpha Primitives. In the 21st century, the Unspoken was detected in Tibet. G.R.A.M.P.A. interpreted this as a possible alliance between communist China and the Inhumans but were unable to identify the Unspoken. Therefore, they called in Quicksilver, an expert on the Inhumans, and U.S. Agent. The former recognized the Unspoken and advised that they call all the Avengers teams (consisting of the Mighty Avengers, the New Avengers, the Young Avengers, the Avengers Resistance, and even the Dark Avengers) to stop him.

Unfortunately, even the joint forces of the New Avengers, Avengers Resistance and Mighty Avengers failed to stem the tide. Most of their force were mutated by the Xerogen Mists, before the Wasp arrived. They both dueled each other at massive sizes. Wasp called him pathetic, for wallowing in his own misery for his mistakes and not learning to move on. The Unspoken was defeated when the chronal ray on board the Slave Engine that accelerated the growth of the Xerogen crystals was used against him, aging him to the point where he was too weak to carry on fighting. The heroes then permitted the Alpha Primitives to allow the Unspoken to return to his cave to live out the rest of his days.

During the Inhumanity storyline, the Unspoken resurfaced and arrived at New Attilan. Due to Black Bolt missing at the time, the Unspoken proposed to Medusa and tried to cover for his missing brother. Medusa refused the Unspoken's offer and had him incarcerated in the dungeon. The Unspoken soon broke free from his imprisonment and headed to New Attilan's catacombs. It is here that the Unspoken starts looking for Terrigen Crystals in order to replenish his powers. Despite the intervention of Medusa and Gorgon, the Unspoken defeated them and reclaimed the throne. The newly transformed Inhumans later helped the Inhuman Royal Family to fight the Unspoken managing to steal the Terrigen Crystals from him. Upon his defeat and being deprived of the Terrigen Crystals, the Unspoken was reimprisoned in the dungeon.

The Unspoken is the living embodiment of Terrigenesis itself. He is capable of altering his form in any way he desires, and can give himself a wide number of abilities, such as mass manipulation and energy construct manifestation. To maintain his powers, he needs to absorb Terrigen Crystals.

Unus the Untouchable

Unuscione

 	
Carmella Unuscione is a mutant, a member of Magneto's Acolytes. The character, created by Scott Lobdell and Brandon Peterson, first appeared in The Uncanny X-Men #298 (March 1993). The character has the ability to generate a tangible field composed of bioelectrical-charged psionic energy around herself, forming an exoskeleton. She is portrayed as one of the more fanatical and violent members of the Acolytes, who often come into conflict with the X-Men.

When Avalon, the Acolytes' base of operations, is destroyed, she uses her power to protect her teammates and the X-Man Cyclops. The former enemies cooperate to survive without resources while Professor X and Amelia Voght struggle to find their teammates' whereabouts. Unuscione and the other Acolytes agree to turn themselves over to government custody, but later escape.

Unuscione returns to action with the Acolytes as they attack the X-Mansion following the M-Day. Professor X is placed in the Acolytes' care after he is critically injured by Bishop. Xavier convinces Exodus to disband the Acolytes, and Unuscione and Joanna Cargill move to Utopia.

Other versions of Unuscione
In the alternate Age of X reality, Unuscione is known as Stand-Off. She is a member of the Force Warriors, a group of psionic mutants who protect "Fortress X", the last known mutant stronghold, by collectively channeling their powers to generate and reinforce a massive psionic shield.

Unuscione in other media
Unuscione appears in the two-part episode "Sanctuary" of the animated series X-Men, where she is a devoted and passionate follower of Magneto and his beliefs. In the episode "Graduation Day," Unuscione is among the mutants on Genosha that want Magneto to lead them.

Uranos

Uranos is a member of the race known as the Eternals in the Marvel Universe. The character, created by Jim Starlin, first appeared in Captain Marvel #29 (November 1973). The character also appears in back-up stories in What If? #24 ("The First Eternals", December 1980), and 26-27 ("Untold Tales Of The Marvel Universe: Outpost On Uranus", April–July 1981).
	
Uranos is Kronos's brother and was banished from Earth along with his followers, after losing a civil war against Kronos. He succeeds in re-materializing and discovers a Kree base on the planet Uranus. Upon destroying Sentry 213 who was stationed there, Uranos uses the weapons there in an attempt to return to Earth and gain revenge on Kronos. Uranos encounters a Kree Armada. After the ship is destroyed, Uranos and the survivors with him resettle on Titan and die during another civil war.

It turns out that the Uranos that was on Titan was just a patchwork clone while the real one is imprisoned in the Exclusion. As the Prime Eternal upon being revived, Uranos' grandnephew Thanos visited him where he received an imprint key that would grant him access to his armories.

At some point in the past, Uranos and Druig met Odin where they talk about the principle of Excess Deviation that involved having to contend with the different mutations and deviations.

During the "A.X.E.: Judgment Day" storyline, Druig goes to the Exclusion to enlist Uranos' help in dealing with the Mutant threat. Druig has Uranos unleashed on Arrako where he plans to deal with the mutants there in an hour. He defeated Legion offscreen, punches Magneto through the chest, defeats Cable and Xilo, and shoots Abigail Brand with Cable's gun before returning to the Exclusion. When the Progenitor declares that all will be judged, Uranos and Druig talk about it as Uranos begs Druig to let him out. At the time when Druig plans to bring the Hex into the Uni-Mind, he declined Uranos' demands to let him out. When the X-Men's telepaths breach the Uni-Mind, Druig has no choice but to release Uranos. After defeating Ikaris and Gilgamesh, Uranos is defeated by Magneto and Storm. Following the Progenitor's defeat, Uranos gets Druig as a cellmate as he plans to show him something that can be done in the next thousand years. As he beats up Druig, Uranos is visited by Zuras who tells him that his gifts will be used for an hour by the Arakki as part of a peace treaty with them and that Uranos will be briefly released to them during the same duration to serve them. Uranos agrees to the terms. Then he goes back to beating up Druig as a way to kill time.

Ben Urich

Phil Urich

Ev Teel Urizen 
Ev Teel Urizen is a fictional character appearing in American comic books published by Marvel Comics. It was created by writer Mike Carey. Ev Teel Urizen first appeared in X-Men (vol. 2) #197 (May 2007). Urizen is a mummudrai, an energy-based mental parasite. Urizen existed harmlessly dormant in its host, the Shi'ar Ul'var Urizen, until Shi'ar scientists extracted it to use as the basis for a superweapon, Hecatomb, designed to consume the minds of a planet's entire population. The Shi'ar lost control of Hecatomb and it pursued Urizen, which it identified as part of itself. Detecting Charles Xavier's psychic energy on Earth, Urizen traveled through space for centuries to reach him, followed by Hecatomb. On Earth, Urizen entered the mind of the comatose Regan Wyngarde, and remained with her after she regained consciousness and helped defeat the Children of the Vault. Still hidden, Urizen risked exposure to protect Regan during a subsequent conflict with the villain Pandemic. Regan eventually detected Urizen and expelled it from her mind. Urizen offered to bond with the powerful mutant Cable to fight Hecatomb. Suspicious of Urizen's motives, Cable initially refused; he reluctantly agreed only after Hecatomb attacked Earth and proved as powerful as Urizen had warned. Hecatomb was able to separate Urizen from Cable, but not before they used their combined powers to wake the comatose Rogue. Urizen spent its last moments in terror as Hecatomb consumed it. Rogue then arrived and, her powers augmented by Pandemic's "Strain 88" virus, absorbed the 8 billion consciousnesses Hecatomb contained, destroying it. Subsequently, Rogue contained the memories of all those minds, but Urizen and its memories were never specifically mentioned.

Ursa Major

U.S. Agent

References

Marvel Comics characters: U, List of